Drapetini is a tribe of hybotid flies widespread in the world. There are 19 currently recognised genera. See the Wikispecies link below for details.

Genera
Allodromia Smith, 1962
Atodrapetis Plant, 1997
Austrodrapetis Smith, 1964
Austrodromia Collin, 1961
Chaetodromia Chillcott & Teskey, 1983
Chersodromia Haliday in Walker, 1851
Crossopalpus Bigot, 1857
Drapetis Meigen, 1822
Dusmetina Gil Collado, 1930
Elaphropeza Macquart, 1827
Isodrapetis Collin, 1961
Megagrapha Melander, 1928
Micrempis Melander, 1928
Nanodromia Grootaert, 1994
Ngaheremyia Plant & Didham, 2006
Pontodromia Grootaert, 1994
Sinodrapetis Yang, Gaimari & Grootaert, 2004
Stilpon Loew, 1859

References

Hybotidae
Brachycera tribes
Taxa named by James Edward Collin